Events from the year 1824 in France.

Incumbents
 Monarch – Louis XVIII (until 16 September), then Charles X
 Prime Minister – Joseph de Villèle

Events
25 February - Legislative election held.
6 March - Legislative election held.
16 September - Charles X succeeds Louis XVIII as King of France.
Cimetière du Montparnasse is established.

Arts and literature
The first collection of poetry by Victor Hugo,  Nouvelles Odes et Poésies Diverses, is published.

Births
15 January - Marie Duplessis, courtesan (died 1847)
11 May - Jean-Léon Gérôme, painter and sculptor (died 1904)
28 June - Paul Broca, physician, anatomist, and anthropologist (died 1880)
12 July - Eugène Boudin, painter (died 1898)
27 July - Alexandre Dumas, fils, writer, author and playwright (died 1895)
6 December - Emmanuel Frémiet, sculptor (died 1910)
14 December - Pierre Puvis de Chavannes, painter (died 1898)
25 December - Rodolphe-Madeleine Cleophas Dareste de la Chavanne, jurist (died 1911)

Full date unknown
Joséphine-Félicité-Augustine Brohan, actress (died 1893)

Deaths
26 January - Théodore Géricault, painter and lithographer (born 1791)
27 January - Jean-Benoît-Vincent Barré, architect (b. c1732)
21 February - Eugène de Beauharnais, soldier and stepson of Napoleon (born 1781)
16 June - Charles-François Lebrun, duc de Plaisance, statesman (born 1739)
21 June - Étienne Aignan, translator, political writer, librettist and playwright (born 1773)
20 July - Maine de Biran, philosopher (born 1766)
16 September - Louis XVIII of France, King of France and Navarre (born 1755)
20 October - Jean-Louis-Paul-François, 5th duc de Noailles, scientist (born 1739)
24 October - André Thouin, botanist (born 1746)
9 December - Anne-Louis Girodet de Roussy-Trioson, painter (born 1767)

See also

References

1820s in France